Donald Warren "D.W." Moffett (born October 26, 1954) is an American film, stage, and television actor. Moffett began his career in stage productions in Chicago before starring in the original New York City production of Larry Kramer's The Normal Heart in 1985. He subsequently starred in a Broadway production of The Boys of Winter the same year. He made his feature film debut in Bob Rafelson's thriller Black Widow (1987) before portraying a serial killer in the thriller Lisa (1990).

Moffett had a supporting role in Bernardo Bertolucci's drama Stealing Beauty (1996), and went on to star in the network series For Your Love (1998–2002). Other film credits from this time include Steven Soderbergh's Traffic (2000), which earned Moffett a Screen Actors Guild Award for Outstanding Performance by a Cast in a Motion Picture, and the coming-of-age drama Thirteen (2003).

Beginning in 2008, Moffett had a recurring role on the NBC drama series Friday Night Lights, appearing in two seasons. From 2011 to 2017, he starred as John Kennish on the ABC Family series Switched at Birth.

Early life
Moffett was born in Highland Park, Illinois, and raised in nearby Wilmette. From the years 1969 to 1974, Moffett attended a private secondary school in Germany, and became fluent in German.

After attending Stanford University, where he majored in international relations, Moffett returned to Chicago and began working as an investment banker. Moffett was unhappy with this career, and later reflected: "About halfway through my tenure at the bank, it became hellishly evident that going to a bar near the Board of Trade building to have double gimlets with secretaries was not my idea of life." At the suggestion of a friend, Moffett enrolled in an acting class at the St. Nicholas Theater Company, where he began studying with William H. Macy. Shortly thereafter, he started his own theater company, Remains Theater.

Career

1984–1999
After appearing in numerous stage productions in Chicago, Moffett starred opposite John Malkovich in a New York City stage production of Balm In Gilead. He took the stage name of "D.W." to avoid confusion with British actor Donald Moffat. In 1984, he appeared in a Broadway production of The Real Thing. He then starred opposite Brad Davis in the original stage production of Larry Kramer's The Normal Heart in 1985, playing a gay man dying of AIDS, for which he won critical acclaim. The same year, he played opposite Matt Dillon in a Broadway production of The Boys of Winter. He also starred opposite Aidan Quinn and Gena Rowlands in the television film An Early Frost, which also dealt with two male lovers during the HIV/AIDS crisis.

In 1987, Moffett made his feature film debut in Bob Rafelson's thriller Black Widow. He subsequently starred in the thriller film Lisa (1990), playing a serial killer whom a teenage girl becomes enamored with, unaware he is a dangerous predator. The same year, he had a supporting part in the psychological horror film Pacific Heights. He also starred in NBC's made-for-television film adaptation of Danielle Steel's novel Fine Things (also 1990), alongside Tracy Pollan.

Moffett subsequently starred opposite Liv Tyler, Jeremy Irons, and Rachel Weisz in Bernardo Bertolucci's Stealing Beauty (1996), and in 1999, had a supporting role in the drama film Molly, starring Elisabeth Shue. Beginning in 1998, Moffett was a main cast member on the NBC (and later, WB) sitcom  For Your Love, which aired until 2002.

2000–present
In 2000, Moffett appeared in an ensemble cast in Steven Soderbergh's crime thriller Traffic (2000), which earned him a Screen Actors Guild Award for Outstanding Performance by a Cast in a Motion Picture. He later had a small role in the drama Thirteen (2003), playing the absent father of a troubled teenage girl (played by Evan Rachel Wood), and subsequently co-starred in the thriller Twisted (2004), portraying the attorney of a serial killer.

In 2005, Moffett performed at the Old Vic theater in London, playing opposite Kevin Spacey in The Philadelphia Story.

He played Bob Hardy in the series Hidden Palms for the CW Network and starred in the 2007 CW series Life Is Wild as Dr. Danny Clarke. Between 2008 and 2010, he co-starred in the NBC drama series Friday Night Lights. From 2011 to 2012, Moffett starred in the comedy series Happily Divorced as Elliot, an on/off love interest of the main character played by Fran Drescher. He also starred as John Kennish: Bay's and Toby's father and Daphne's biological father, in the ABC Family series Switched at Birth, which ran from 2011 until 2017.

In 2017, Moffett was named chair of the film and television program at the Savannah College of Art and Design.

Filmography

Television

Theatre

References

External links

1954 births
Living people
American male film actors
American male television actors
HuffPost writers and columnists
Male actors from Chicago
Outstanding Performance by a Cast in a Motion Picture Screen Actors Guild Award winners
People from Wilmette, Illinois
Stanford University alumni